Love Rules may refer to:

"Love Rules", a song by Don Henley for soundtrack of 1982 American film Fast Times at Ridgemont High
Love Rules!, 2004 American ABC Family comedy film
Love Rules (album), 2010 album by Carolyn Dawn Johnson